Owl Creek is an unincorporated community in Bell County, in the U.S. state of Texas. According to the Handbook of Texas, the community had a population of 45 in 2000. It is located within the Killeen-Temple-Fort Hood metropolitan area.

History
Owl Creek was named for a nearby creek of the same name. The area in what is now known as Owl Creek today was first settled as early as the 1850s. After Belton Lake was built in the 1950s, a park opened along its upper north shore and provided recreational activities such as picnicking and camping. There were no population estimates recorded for the community, but it did have a population of 45 from 1990 through 2000.

Geography

Education
Owl Creek had its own school in the 1890s and served area children until around the 1900s. Today, the community is served by the Belton Independent School District.

References

Unincorporated communities in Texas
Unincorporated communities in Bell County, Texas